Ghana Rowing and Canoeing Association is the umbrella body that governs and promotes rowing and canoeing in Ghana. The association is headquartered in Accra. The association promotes the sport of canoeing by organizing courses and competitions for interest participants. Through such competitions, the association is able to select winners to participate in international tournaments.

Executive board
The association has the following executives:
President - Francis Decland
Vice President - Kamal Sulley
Immediate past president - Hon. Jonathan Nii Tackie Kommey (M.P) 
Secretary General - Saka Acquaye

Competitions
The association has sent competing teams to major competitions including:
2009 All African Games held in Ivory Coast.
2009 West African Canoe Kayak Championship

Donations
The Association received a fleet of boats from FISA to aid in the development of  rowing and canoeing in the country.

References

 
National members of the International Canoe Federation
Row
Ghana
1990 establishments in Ghana